The Austrian Cultural Forum New York (ACFNY) is one of Austria's two cultural representation offices in the United States; the other is in Washington, D.C. It is part of the worldwide network of Austrian Cultural Forums overseen by the Austrian Federal Ministry for European and International Affairs.

History
ACFNY was founded as the Austrian Institute in 1942 in New York City by Austrian immigrants to the United States for the purpose of preserving and disseminating Austrian culture. One of the leading figures of that time was émigré Irene Harand, who served as the Institute's Vice President.

In 1963, it opened offices at its current location at 11 East 52nd Street in Manhattan, as the official cultural representation office of the Austrian federal government. In 2002, the institution, now called the Austrian Cultural Forum, moved into a new building at the location of its former townhouse.

ACFNY is a division of the Austrian consulate in New York. Michael Haider, an Austrian diplomat, has been its director since October 2018. His predecessors include Christine Moser, Andreas Stadler, Christoph Thun-Hohenstein, Wolfgang Waldner, Peter Marboe, Fritz Cocron, and Wilhelm Schlag.

Building
A competition was held in 1992 to choose a design for ACFNY's new building. Raimund Abraham was the winning architect among 226 submissions. The building's facade is clad in glass and aluminum and gradually tapers to a narrow point as it slants upwards in accordance with zoning laws. It houses exhibition spaces, a theater, a library for books and audio recordings, offices, seminar and reception rooms, and apartments for the officers of the institution. The library is named in honor of Frederic Morton and has a collection of more than 10,000 books specific to Austrian art and culture.

Activities
Since its founding, ACFNY has served as a place for cultural exchange between Austrians and Americans throughout the United States, with the exception of Washington D.C., which has its own cultural forum under the auspices of the Austrian Embassy. It introduces Austrian artists at venues across the country.

In the ACFNY building, five floors are used as exhibition space for predominantly contemporary art. Some exhibits make use of and showcase the building's unique architecture. Concerts and performances are presented in the in-house auditorium and at other venues in New York. In addition to films, AFCNY offers talks, readings, and book presentations.

References

External links

Austrian culture
Buildings and structures in Manhattan
Art museums and galleries in Manhattan
Midtown Manhattan
Cultural centers in New York City
Libraries in Manhattan
Austria–United States relations
Austrian American